Paris and Love (Egyptian Arabic: باريس والحب, French: Paris et l’amour, translit: Paris wal Hob or Baris walhabu) is a 1972 romantic drama starring Salah Zulfikar, Sabah, Yousuf Shaaban. It is directed by Mohamed Salman.

Plot 
The film revolves around a poor family that financially depends heavily on their daughter, Halla, who works as a singer in small bars. One day, the daughter meets Aziz, a young millionaire who returns from Paris and she falls in love with him. The family encourages this relationship until she marries this millionaire in order to lift them out of poverty in which they live.  However, Halla refuses to consummate the marriage due to the disparity in the social level but she's still in love with Aziz.

Primary cast 

 Salah Zulfikar as Aziz
 Sabah as Halla
 Yousuf Shaaban as Mounir
 Mohammad Reda as Raouf
 Samira Baroudi as Rime
 Akram El Ahmar
 Silvana Badrakhan
 Samir Abu Said

See also
 Cinema of Egypt
 Cinema of Lebanon
 List of Egyptian films
 List of Lebanese films
 Salah Zulfikar filmography

References

External links 

 Paris and Love on elCinema

1972 films
Paris and Love
Paris and Love
Paris and Love